The Suriname national under-20 football team  represents Suriname in international football at this age level and is overseen by the Surinaamse Voetbal Bond.

Technical Staff

 Head Coach: Werner Blackson
 Asst. Coach: Raymond Mannen
 Goalkeeping Coach: Rodney Oldenstam

Current players
The following 20 players were called up for the 2022 CONCACAF U-20 Championship.

Recent call-ups
The following players have also been called up to the Suriname U20 squad within the last twelve months.

Former Coaches 
 2010 -  Harold Deyl

References

Under-20
Caribbean national under-20 association football teams
South American national under-20 association football teams